Guadalupe Calello  (born 13 April 1990) is an Argentine former footballer who played as a goalkeeper.

She was part of the Argentina women's national football team  at the 2008 Summer Olympics.

See also
 Argentina at the 2008 Summer Olympics

References

External links

gettyimages.in

1990 births
Living people
Argentine women's footballers
Club Atlético River Plate (women) players
Argentina women's international footballers
Place of birth missing (living people)
Footballers at the 2008 Summer Olympics
Olympic footballers of Argentina
Women's association football goalkeepers